School of Architecture and Planning (SAP) is one of the four constituent colleges of Anna University, Chennai, Tamil Nadu (India). It was established as a Department of Architecture of the University of Madras in 1957 and was located in the Alagappa College of Technology. The department was later renamed as the School of Architecture and Planning and shifted to its own independent campus in 1968. It is now a constituent college of Anna University.

After formulation of Anna University in 1978, the School of Architecture and Planning, being one of the four constituent autonomous institutions of Anna University, started to functions as two departments namely Department of Architecture and Department of Planning from 2005 till date. Dr. Ranee Vedamuthu is the Dean and HOD(i/c)-Department of Architecture and Dr. Masilamani is the HOD(i/c) -Department of Planning. 

The school conducts undergraduate and postgraduate courses in Architecture and a postgraduate course in Planning. The UG &PG courses currently offered are B.Arch, M.Arch, M.Arch (Landscape) and M.Plan. SAP also offers Ph D programs in Architecture and Planning and MS degree (through research). 

Under the memorandum of understanding, the Architecture Department has strong connections with various international partners and institution from Europe and United States enabling students and staff to participate in international exchanges through collaborative academic and research works.

The school has its own library with a collection of publications of about 15,000 which include books, Journals, thesis reports and back volumes. The Library has now become a resource center for Architectural colleges of Tamil Nadu as well as for other State.

Dr. Ranee Vedamuthu, Chairman of the Faculty of Architecture and Planning is the Professor in-charge of Library. 

SAP has a Centre for Human Settlements (CHS) which is an autonomous Centre of the Anna University t was established in the year 1980. It is an interdisciplinary Centre offering Consultancy, Training, Research and Extension services in the areas related to Urban and Regional Planning, Development and Management.  Dr. Masilamani is the director of CHS. 

The Quality Improvement Program (QIP) Cell was established by the AICTE at SAP campus and has provided the research facilities for teachers of other architectural institutions besides providing admission to PG degree course. Till date 16 teachers from various Schools of Architecture have benefited by the Cell. The QIP Cell also conducts short term training programs for faculty of architecture and Continuing Education programs for professionals.

External links 
 Official Webpage

Architecture schools in India
Universities in Chennai
Academic institutions formerly affiliated with the University of Madras
Colleges affiliated to Anna University